Kenneth "Kenny" Grant Cresswell (born 4 June 1958 in New Zealand) is an association football player who represented New Zealand internationally, appearing in all 3 matches of New Zealand's first FIFA World Cup finals appearance.

Career
Cresswell made his full All Whites debut in a 2–0 win over Singapore on 1 October 1978. He played in all 3 matches at the 1982 FIFA World Cup in Spain, where they lost to Scotland, USSR and Brazil. Cresswell ended his international playing career having played 64 times for New Zealand, of which 33 were official full internationals in which he scored 2 goals. His final cap was a substitute appearance in a 12–0 win over Western Samoa on 11 November 1987.

References

External links

1958 births
Living people
1982 FIFA World Cup players
New Zealand association footballers
New Zealand international footballers
Gisborne City AFC players
Association football midfielders